Anin a Palestinian village in the West Bank governorate of Jenin. According to the Palestinian Central Bureau of Statistics, the village had a population of 3,719 inhabitants in mid-year 2006.

History 
Potsherds from  Iron Age I, IA II, Persian, early and late Roman, Byzantine,  early Muslim and the Middle Ages have been found here.

"Immediately north of the village is a rock-cut passage large enough to walk along, extending about 50 feet and lined with cement; it then becomes about a foot high. This leads out on to a flat surface of rock.(...) Two rock-cut tombs, now blocked, exist west of this."

Ottoman era 
'Anin, like the rest of Israel, was incorporated into the Ottoman Empire in 1517, and in the  census of 1596 it was a part of the nahiya ("subdistrict") of  Sahil Atlit which was under the administration of the liwa ("district") of  Lajjun.  The village had a population of 16 households, all Muslim. The villagers  paid a fixed tax rate of 25%  on  wheat, barley, summer crops, olive trees, in addition to occasional revenues and a press for olive oil or grape syrup; a total of 3,600  akçe. Potsherds from the Ottoman era have also been found here.

In 1882, the PEF's Survey of Western Palestine described Anin as:  "a small village on a ridge, partly built of stone, with a small olive grove beneath it on the west, and two wells on that side. It has the appearance of an ancient site, having rock-cut tombs, and a curious channel for water."

British mandate era 
In the 1922 census of Palestine, conducted by the British Mandate authorities, the village had a population of 360 Muslims, increasing  in the 1931 census  to 447 Muslims, in 68 houses. 

In the 1944/5 statistics the population of Anin was 590  Muslims, with a total of 15,049  dunams of land, according to an official land and population survey. Of this, 1,769 dunams were used for  plantations and irrigable land, 1,806  dunams for cereals, while 13 dunams were built-up (urban) land.

Jordanian era
After the 1948 Arab-Israeli War, 'Anin came  under Jordanian rule.

The Jordanian census of 1961 found 752 inhabitants.

Post-1967
'Anin has been  under Israeli control along with the rest of the West Bank since the 1967 Six-Day War.

References

Bibliography

External links 
 Welcome To 'Anin
Survey of Western Palestine, Map 8: IAA, Wikimedia commons 
 Olive wars, 2014, BBC, 'Anin  16.00-21:00 

Villages in the West Bank
Jenin Governorate
Municipalities of the State of Palestine